John Wallop (died 1405) was a draper and the member of the Parliament of England for Salisbury for the parliaments of 1402 and October 1404. He was also mayor or Salisbury.

References 

Members of Parliament for Salisbury
English MPs 1402
Year of birth unknown
1405 deaths
Mayors of Salisbury
English MPs October 1404